Restless Ones is the fifth album by American folk band, Heartless Bastards. The album was released on June 16, 2015 through Partisan Records. This is their second release with Partisan Records.

Track listing

References

2015 albums
Heartless Bastards albums
Blues rock albums by American artists
Country rock albums by American artists
Folk rock albums by American artists